For people named Jack Briggs, see Jack Briggs (disambiguation).
Jack Briggs is an American radio broadcaster.

Originally from Cleveland, Ohio, Briggs is currently Assistant Sports Director for the Associated Press. He has been with AP Radio for 30 years and is currently the on-air anchor for 50 sportscasts per week. Briggs is also one of the AP's two primary anchors for Olympic programming, having been to every Olympics since 1980.

Briggs did play-by-play work on broadcasts of Utah Stars games in the American Basketball Association until the team's demise in December 1975. He has also called college basketball games for many years.

References

American Basketball Association announcers
American Football League announcers
American radio sports announcers
Basketball mass media
Radio personalities from Cleveland
Oakland Raiders announcers
Utah Stars
Year of birth missing (living people)
Living people
College basketball announcers in the United States